Mordellistena downesi is a beetle in the genus Mordellistena of the family Mordellidae. It was described in 1965 by Medvedev.

References

downesi
Beetles described in 1965